Qorejineh (also known as Ghooreh Jineh) is a village in Kuhin Rural District, in the Central District of Kabudarahang County, Hamadan Province, Iran. At the 2006 census, its population was 1,095 from 195 families.

References 

Populated places in Kabudarahang County